Lance Dry (born 14 December 1975) is a New Zealand cricketer. He played in five first-class matches for Wellington from 1994 to 1999.

See also
 List of Wellington representative cricketers

References

External links
 

1975 births
Living people
New Zealand cricketers
Wellington cricketers
Cricketers from Wellington City